is a private university in Higashi-ku, Sapporo Hokkaidō, Japan, established in 2006. The predecessor of the school was founded in 1906.

Faculties
 Art (Fine Arts / Music)
 Sociology

History

In 1910,  renewed.

External links
 Official website 

Educational institutions established in 1906
Private universities and colleges in Japan
Universities and colleges in Sapporo
Higashi-ku, Sapporo
1906 establishments in Japan